Salem Township is one of the twenty-two townships of Tuscarawas County, Ohio, United States.  The 2000 census found 1,673 people in the township, 1,121 of whom lived in the unincorporated portions of the township.

History
Salem Township derives its name from the town of the same name mentioned in the Bible. The settlement of Salem, among the first in the Northwest Territory, was founded by a group of Moravian Christians, both European and Native American (Christian Munsee and Christian Mohican), led by the Christian missionary John Heckewelder. 

It is one of fourteen Salem Townships statewide.

Geography
Located in the southwestern part of the county, it borders the following townships:
Jefferson Township - north
Clay Township - east
Washington Township - southeast
Oxford Township - south
Oxford Township, Coshocton County - southwest corner
Adams Township, Coshocton County - west

The village of Port Washington is located in eastern Salem Township.

Government
The township is governed by a three-member board of trustees, who are elected in November of odd-numbered years to a four-year term beginning on the following January 1. Two are elected in the year after the presidential election and one is elected in the year before it. There is also an elected township fiscal officer, who serves a four-year term beginning on April 1 of the year after the election, which is held in November of the year before the presidential election. Vacancies in the fiscal officership or on the board of trustees are filled by the remaining trustees.  The current trustees are Donald Meek, Ray Stocker, and Robert Thornton, and the fiscal officer is Patty Arth.

References

External links
County website

Townships in Tuscarawas County, Ohio
Townships in Ohio
Settlements of the Moravian Church